Magnastigma is a Neotropical genus of butterfly in the family Lycaenidae.

References

Eumaeini
Butterflies of Central America
Lycaenidae of South America
Fauna of the Amazon
Lycaenidae genera